Brejo do Cruz is a city located in the sertão of Paraíba, Brazil. The musician Zé Ramalho was born here.

References

External links 
 Brejo do Cruz City Hall

Municipalities in Paraíba